Antranik Apelian (26 December 1929 - 10 June 2017) was a French-Armenian rugby league footballer who played in 1950s and 1960s, as a . At club level, he played for Marseille XIII for all of his career, with which he won the Lord Derby Cup in 1965 and ended second in the 1954 French Rugby League Championship final. He was surnamed "Niky". Outside the field, he worked as a firefighter in the Marseille Naval Fire Battalion. He also had a reputation of being "tough as nails".

His performances at club level brought him to the France national team between 1955 and 1961, taking part at the 1957 Rugby League World Cup. He was capped 20 times for France.

After his career as player, Apelian moved to Corsica, where he trained the clubs Ajax XIII and Appietto XIII.

Honours
French Championship
1 time champion in 1954
Lord Derby Cup
1 time champion in 1965
1 time runner-up in 1955

Bibliography

References

External links
Antranick Apellian on rugbyleagueproject.org

1929 births
2017 deaths
France national rugby league team players
French people of Armenian descent
French rugby league players
Marseille XIII players
Rugby league hookers
Sportspeople from Marseille